Associação Desportiva Bahia de Feira, commonly referred to as Bahia de Feira, is a Brazilian football club based in Feira de Santana, Bahia. The club plays in Série D, the fourth tier of Brazilian football, as well as in the Campeonato Baiano, the top level of the Bahia state football league.

History
The club was founded on 2 July 1937. Bahia de Feira won the Campeonato Baiano Second Level in 1982, 1986, and in 2009. They won the Campeonato Baiano in 2011, after beating Vitória in the final. Bahia de Feira competed in the Série D in 2011, when they were eliminated in the First Stage of the competition.

Achievements

 Campeonato Baiano:
 Winners (1): 2011
 Campeonato Baiano Second Division:
 Winners (3): 1982, 1986, 2009

Stadium

Associação Desportiva Bahia de Feira play their home games at Estádio Municipal Alberto Oliveira, nicknamed Estádio Joia da Princesa. The stadium has a maximum capacity of 16,274 people.

References

External links
 Official website

Association football clubs established in 1937
Football clubs in Bahia
1937 establishments in Brazil